Jenista Elaine Clark (born October 31, 1988) is an American professional soccer defender who played for 1. FFC Frankfurt of the German Frauen Bundesliga and was named an assistant coach for Minnesota Aurora FC in 2021. 

Clark signed for European champions Frankfurt in 2015, after three seasons with Bundesliga rivals SC Freiburg. She had arrived in Germany during the 2011–12 winter transfer window and played the remainder of that season with Lokomotive Leipzig. Delaying her graduation, she spent the 2011 campaign with Sky Blue FC of Women's Professional Soccer (WPS). Clark was named an assistant coach for the Minnesota Aurora, a USL W League team that began play in 2022.

References

External links

 Connect World Football profile
 Framba.de profile 

Living people
American women's soccer players
Soccer players from Iowa
American expatriate soccer players in Germany
American expatriate women's soccer players
1988 births
Women's association football defenders
1. FFC Frankfurt players
SC Freiburg (women) players
Frauen-Bundesliga players
NJ/NY Gotham FC players
People from Warren County, Iowa
Minnesota Golden Gophers women's soccer players
Women's Professional Soccer players